Goodbye Emmanuelle (aka Emmanuelle 3) is a 1977 French softcore erotica movie directed by François Leterrier, and starring Sylvia Kristel. The music score is by Serge Gainsbourg. In this sequel, Emmanuelle and Jean move to the Seychelles, where she leaves him.

Premise
Emmanuelle (Sylvia Kristel) and her architect husband Jean continue their amoral lifestyle in the Seychelles. But when a casual dalliance between her and Gregory, a film director, starts to turn serious her husband shows very traditional signs of jealousy.

Cast
 Sylvia Kristel as Emmanuelle
 Umberto Orsini as Jean
 Alexandra Stewart as Dorothée
 Olga Georges-Picot as Florence
 Jean-Pierre Bouvier as Grégory
 Sylvie Fennec as Clara
 Caroline Laurence as Cécile
 Charlotte Alexandra as Chloe

Production
Goodbye Emmanuelle was intended as the last of a trilogy that included Emmanuelle (1974) and Emmanuelle 2 (1975).  It was shot on the Seychellois island of La Digue.

Release
The film was originally released in France in 1977 through Parafrance and Warner-Columbia Film.  In the early 1980s, it became the first movie to be released through Miramax Films, a U.S. independent distributor.  The company's founders, Bob and Harvey Weinstein, acquired the rights from producer Yves Rousset-Rouard at the Cannes Film Festival.  Several years later, the film became a late-night offering on the Cinemax and Showtime cable channels.

Reception
In The New York Times review, critic John Corry observed that "The scenery [in Goodbye Emmanuelle] wins every time", but was less favorable about what he deemed "wearisome" sex scenes.  Corry reflected on both aspects in his critique: "The question in the movie is whether Francois Leterrier, its director, was so absorbed in the lovemaking that he just allowed the scenery to creep in, or whether he put it in on purpose. Maybe it doesn't matter."

References

External links
 

1977 films
1970s erotic drama films
1970s pornographic films
Films directed by François Leterrier
Films set in Seychelles
Films shot in Seychelles
Emmanuelle
French erotic drama films
Films scored by Serge Gainsbourg
French pornographic films
1977 drama films
1970s French-language films
1970s French films